Events in the year 1510 in Portugal.

Incumbents
King of Portugal and the Algarves: Manuel I

Events
Portuguese conquest of Goa

Births
Paulo Dias de Novais, Captain-Governor of Portuguese Angola (died 1589)
Simão Rodrigues, Jesuit priest (died 1579)

Deaths
1 March - Francisco de Almeida, nobleman, soldier and explorer (born c.1450)

See also
History of Portugal (1415–1578)

References

 
Years of the 16th century in Portugal
Portugal